Mehdi Radouane Guerrouad (born 29 September 1981 in France) is a French retired footballer.

Career

After failing to make an appearance for French Ligue 1 side Lille OSC, Guerrouad signed for R.A.A. Louviéroise in the Belgian second division, where he had difficulty adapting due to the long season with Lille OSC.

For the second half of 2003/04, he signed for Danish top-flight club Viborg FF, where he only made 4 appearances over 2 seasons due to injury, before playing for Étoile Fréjus Saint-Raphaël, Feignies Aulnoye, as well as R.F.C. Tournai in the French and Belgian lower leagues.

While playing for R.A.A. Louviéroise, Guerrouad was called up to the Algeria national under-23 team. Despite aiming to represent Algeria internationally, he never made an appearance for them.

References

External links
 

Living people
French footballers
Association football midfielders
1981 births
R.A.A. Louviéroise players
Viborg FF players